Mohamed Basri (born 1 January 1971) is a Moroccan wrestler. He competed in the men's Greco-Roman 100 kg at the 1996 Summer Olympics.

References

External links
 

1971 births
Living people
Moroccan male sport wrestlers
Olympic wrestlers of Morocco
Wrestlers at the 1996 Summer Olympics
Place of birth missing (living people)